Hans-Valentin Hube (29 October 1890 – 21 April 1944) was a German general during World War II who commanded armoured forces in the  invasions of Poland, France and the Soviet Union. He died in an air crash on 21 April 1944.

Early career
Hans-Valentin Hube was born on 29 October 1890, in Naumburg an der Saale, German Empire. Hube volunteered for military service in the Prussian Army in 1909, and served during World War I where he saw action during the Race to the Sea, and was awarded the Iron Cross 2nd Class and the Knight's Cross of the House Order of Hohenzollern. He had an arm amputated as a result of injuries sustained at the battle of Verdun. In 1918, following the end of the war which ended with the German Empire's defeat and subsequent collapse, Hube briefly served with the right-wing Freikorps paramilitary during the instability. Hube joined the Reichswehr, the successor of the Imperial German Army after the establishment of the Weimar Republic, and continued his army service in the Wehrmacht after the founding of Nazi Germany, reaching the rank of Oberst in 1936.

World War II
Hube took part in the invasion of Poland and the Battle of France as a regimental commander. During the war with France he issued a pamphlet to his soldiers stating "the deployment of black and colored troops against the German army contradicts the conception of the white race's master role towards the colored people" and that it is  "a shame and dishonor, all the more so because our division has had to wage the hardest fights against the Negroes".

Hube was appointed commander of 16th Infantry Division in June 1940. As commander of the 16th Panzer Division, he took part in Operation Barbarossa as part of Field Marshal Gerd von Rundstedt's Army Group South. For this action during the campaign, Hube received the Knight's Cross of the Iron Cross. On 16 January 1942, he was awarded the Oak leaves to the Knight's Cross for his actions in the Battle of Kiev. Hube then led the division during Fall Blau and the Battle of Stalingrad. On 16 September 1942, Hube was given command of XIV Panzer Corps, the parent formation of the 16th Panzer Division.

Hube commanded the XIV Corps during the Soviet counter-offensive, Operation Uranus. During his time at the Führer-Headquarters in Rastenburg, Hube argued strongly, but to no avail, for Hitler to allow the 6th Army to attempt a breakout. Instead, Hitler promised a new relief attack beginning in the middle of February.

After the destruction of the 6th Army, Hube was sent to the Mediterranean front. He created  in Sicily, a four-division force whose task was to defend the island. With the advent of Operation Husky on 10 July, Hube commanded the overall German defence. On 17 July 1943 Hube was given command of all army and Flak troops on the island. Hube organised the evacuation to the Italian peninsula. He had prepared a strong defensive line, the 'Etna Line' around Messina, that would enable the Germans to make a progressive retreat while evacuating large parts of his army to the mainland. George S. Patton began his assault on the line at Troina, but it was a linchpin of the defense and stubbornly held. Despite three 'end run' amphibious landings the Germans managed to keep the bulk of their forces beyond reach of capture, and maintain their evacuation plans. Withdrawing a large number of troops from the threat of capture on Sicily represented a major success for the Axis. Hube later took part in the battles defending positions at Salerno during the Allied Operation Avalanche.

Afterwards Hube was moved back to Germany and transferred to the Führerreserve. On 23 October 1943, Hube was designated commander of the 200,000 man 1st Panzer Army, then serving with Army Group South under Field Marshal Erich von Manstein. In February 1944, Hube was officially confirmed as commander of the 1st Panzer Army. Shortly after, III Panzer Corps, one of Hube's units, was required to assist German forces breaking out of the Korsun-Cherkassy pocket. Soon after this, Hube's force was encircled in a pocket near Kamenets-Podolsky. Hube led the breakout which lasted from 27 March 1944 until 15 April 1944.

Death

Hube was killed when the aircraft that was transporting him crashed after takeoff in Salzburg on 21 April 1944.

Hube was given a state funeral in Berlin on 26 April 1944. His coffin was laid out in the Reich Chancellery, and the eulogy was delivered by Heinz Guderian. The guard of honour consisted of the generals Walther Nehring, Hermann Breith, Heinrich Eberbach and Hans Gollnick. Hube was buried at the Invalids' Cemetery in Berlin.

Works by Hube

Awards

 Iron Cross (1914) 2nd Class (1915) & 1st Class (1916)
 Knight's Cross of the House Order of Hohenzollern with Swords (1918)
 Clasp to the Iron Cross (1939) 2nd Class (24 May 1940) & 1st Class (3 June 1940)
 Knight's Cross of the Iron Cross with Oak Leaves, Swords and Diamonds

References

Citations

Bibliography

External links
 

1890 births
1944 deaths
People from Naumburg (Saale)
People from the Province of Saxony
Burials at the Invalids' Cemetery
German commanders at the Battle of Stalingrad
German Army generals of World War II
Colonel generals of the German Army (Wehrmacht)
German Army personnel of World War I
Prussian Army personnel
Recipients of the Knight's Cross of the Iron Cross with Oak Leaves, Swords and Diamonds
Commanders of the Military Order of Savoy
German amputees
Victims of aviation accidents or incidents in Austria
Recipients of the clasp to the Iron Cross, 1st class
Reichswehr personnel
Victims of aviation accidents or incidents in 1944
Military personnel from Saxony-Anhalt